The 2019 World Series of Poker Europe took place from October 13-November 4 at King's Casino in Rozvadov, Czech Republic. There were 15 bracelet events, including, for the first time at the WSOPE, a short deck event and a €100,000 Diamond High Roller No Limit Hold'em event. The €10,350 No Limit Hold'em Main Event began on October 25.

Event schedule
Source:

Player of the Year
Final standings as of November 4 (end of WSOPE):

Main Event
The 2019 World Series of Poker Europe Main Event began on October 25 with the first of two starting flights. Registration remained open until Level 12 on Day 2, with players allowed one re-entry. The final table was reached on October 30, with the winner being determined on October 31.

The Main Event attracted 541 entries, the most since 2011 and the biggest field in the three years the tournament was held at King's Casino. The top 82 players finished in the money, with the winner earning €1,133,678.

Final Table

*-Career statistics prior to the beginning of the 2019 WSOPE Main Event

Final Table results

References

World Series of Poker Europe
2019 in poker